GM2 can refer to:
 General MIDI Level 2
 GM2 (ganglioside)
 Gundam Musou 2